Thirunallar taluk is a taluk of Karaikal District, Puducherry, India. The taluk headquarters is located at Thirunallar.

The taluk consists of the following revenue villages:

 Vadamattam
 Kilianur
 Agarakurumbagaram
 Melakasakudy
 Melasuprayapuram
 Pettai
 Sorakudy
 Elyankudi
 Uliapathu
 Sellur
 Thennankudy
 Pandaravadisethur
 Nallambal
 Ambagarathur

It also includes the following commune panchayats.

 Thirunallar
 Nedungadu

Taluks of Karaikal district